Jill Henselwood (born November 1, 1962) is a Canadian Equestrian Team member who competes in show jumping.

At the 2008 Summer Olympics in Beijing, Henselwood (riding her horse Special Ed) won the silver medal as part of the Canadian team in team jumping, together with teammates Mac Cone, Eric Lamaze, and Ian Millar.

She lives in Oxford Mills, Ontario.

Her horse, an Oldenburg gelding named Special Ed, was born in 1994 in Germany.

References

1962 births
Canadian female equestrians
Canadian show jumping riders
Equestrians at the 2007 Pan American Games
Equestrians at the 2008 Summer Olympics
Equestrians at the 2012 Summer Olympics
Living people
Medalists at the 2008 Summer Olympics
Olympic equestrians of Canada
Olympic medalists in equestrian
Olympic silver medalists for Canada
Sportspeople from Ottawa
Pan American Games gold medalists for Canada
Pan American Games medalists in equestrian
Medalists at the 2007 Pan American Games
20th-century Canadian women
21st-century Canadian women